The American Occupational Therapy Foundation (AOTF) is a charitable, scientific and educational non-profit organization founded in 1965. Its purpose is to advance the science of occupational therapy to support people's full participation in meaningful life activities. The foundation is governed by a board of trustees and awards grants for scientific research and scholarships. It also publishes a scientific journal, OTJR, Occupation, Participation and Health, indexed by the National Library of Medicine and others. It sponsors the honor society Pi Theta Epsilon. It is based in Rockville, Maryland.

References

External links 

 The American Occupational Therapy Foundation 
 OTJR, Occupation, Participation and Health

Occupational therapy organizations

Non-profit organizations based in Washington, D.C.